Pseudogaurotina cressoni is a species of the Lepturinae subfamily in the long-horned beetle family. This beetle is distributed in Canada, and the United States.

Subtaxa 
There are two subspecies in species:
 Pseudogaurotina cressoni cressoni (Bland, 1864) 
 Pseudogaurotina cressoni lecontei (Casey, 1913)

References

Lepturinae
Beetles described in 1864